Theme of Secrets was a 'New Age' album written and produced by Eddie Jobson, released in 1985. Contrarily to his previous album The Green Album (1983), this record was not marketed as a band effort, instead being presented as an Eddie Jobson solo album and a showcase for the Synclavier.

A music video of one track, "Memories of Vienna", appeared on the Channel 4 programme Art of Landscape. It featured scenes of the town of Vienna accompanied by the music. This also appeared on VH-1 in the United States. The album was released simultaneously on CD and on LP on Private Music label. It was re-released in South Korea in 2004.

A sequel of the album entitled Theme of Mystery was recorded, but was never released. Jobson made available one track (entitled "Antarctica") to the members of the Zealot's Lounge, his personal fan club.

Background and recording
Jobson later recounted:

Reception

Allmusic's retrospective review consisted of a single sentence: "This masterpiece of soundscapes was created by using the Synclavier computer, and is a brilliant album from start to finish."

Track listing

Personnel
 Eddie Jobson – synthesizer, synclavier

Production
 Recorded on the Mitsubishi X80 at Beartracks Studio, Suffern, New York. 
 Produced by Peter Baumann
 Engineered by Peter Baumann and Eddie Jobson
 Mastered by George Marino

Notes and references

1985 albums
Eddie Jobson albums
Private Music albums